This article is a list of episodes from the television show Gatchaman Fighter in order by production number.

Episodes

References

Further reading 
 G-Force: Animated

Lists of science fiction television series episodes
Gatchaman episodes